Murder Most Royal (a.k.a. The King's Pleasure)  (1949) is an historical fiction novel by Jean Plaidy.

The novel focuses on two of Henry VIII's wives, Anne Boleyn and Catherine Howard. It begins with Anne as a young woman leaving for Brussels, then returning to England; her rise to power in the English court; her marriage to Henry VIII as his second wife; and her subsequent execution. In parallel, the life of Catherine Howard, Anne's first cousin, is also recounted. She becomes Henry VIII's fifth wife, but, after claims of adultery, is also executed.

Characters

References

See also 

1949 British novels
Cultural depictions of Henry VIII
Cultural depictions of Anne Boleyn
Cultural depictions of Catherine of Aragon
Historical novels
Catherine Howard
Novels by Eleanor Hibbert
Works published under a pseudonym
Fiction set in the 1530s
Robert Hale books
Novels set in Tudor England